Cry-Star: First of the Free is a 1998 role-playing game supplement for Providence published by XID Creative.

Contents
Cry-Star: First of the Free is a supplement in which the capital of the Alliance of Kings is described.

Reception
Cry-Star: First of the Free was reviewed in the online second version of Pyramid which said "The caste conflicts and multi-sided intrigues of Cry-Star are a microcosm of what's going on in the entire game world, and it gives players a solid grounding in what's really going on. It ain't pretty."

Reviews
Backstab #15

References

Role-playing game books
Role-playing game supplements introduced in 1998